Thomas Häfner (1928-1985) was a realistic and fantastic art painter. Häfner was a member of a group of German artists who called themselves the Young Realists, formed in Düsseldorf in the mid-Fifties.

Escaping the horrors of the Second World War, he live for a decade in Ceylon (1938–1948). He studied at the Kunstakademie in Düsseldorf.
Detail from his painting "Lucifer" is used to illustrate the novel "Moravagine" by Blaise Cendrars.

References

1928 births
1985 deaths
20th-century German painters
20th-century German male artists
German male painters